Iphigénie en Tauride (Iphigeneia in Tauris)  is a tragédie lyrique in four acts by Niccolò Piccinni, which was first performed on 23 January 1781 by the Académie royale de musique (the Paris Opéra) in the second Salle du Palais-Royal. The opera's libretto, by Alphonse du Congé Dubreuil, is based on a play of the same name by Claude Guimond de La Touche, although the ultimate source was the tragedy Iphigeneia in Tauris by Euripides.

Background

Iphigénie en Tauride marked the climax of the quarrel between the supporters of Piccinni and those of Christoph Willibald Gluck. Piccinni had been brought to Paris in the mid-1770s as a rival to the German composer, who had already had great success with his operas there. 
Arguments about the respective merits of their heroes raged between "Gluckists" and "Piccinnists", although the composers themselves showed less enthusiasm for the fight. When Gluck learned that Piccinni was setting the same libretto to Roland as he was, he abandoned work on his score. For his part, Piccinni was an admirer of Gluck's music and was reluctant to challenge him. Nevertheless, in 1778 the director of the Paris Opéra, Jacques de Vismes du Valgay, finally succeeded in arranging a direct confrontation when he persuaded both composers to write an opera on the same story, but not the same libretto: Iphigénie en Tauride.

Piccinni accepted on condition that his version was staged first. In the event, problems with the quality of the libretto (and, possibly, backstage political manoeuvrings) meant that Gluck's opera was the first to receive its premiere in May, 1779. Gluck's Iphigénie en Tauride was immediately acclaimed as a masterpiece. The success of his rival caused Piccinni to delay his own opera even further and it was not until a year and a half later that it was finally presented to a Parisian audience. The reaction was lukewarm, although a revival in 1785 was received more favourably.

Roles

Synopsis
The plot is very similar to that of Gluck's opera. The main difference is that in Piccinni's version King Thoas is in love with Iphigénie and is consequently a less "barbaric" character.

Recording
Iphigénie en Tauride, Soloists, Chorus and Orchestra of the Teatro Petruzzelli, Bari, conducted by Donato Renzetti (Fonit Cetra, 1986) (a recording of the first modern revival)

References
Notes

Sources
 Holden, Amanda (Ed.), The New Penguin Opera Guide, New York: Penguin Putnam, 2001. 
 Iphigénie en Tauride on delteatro.it In Italian

1781 operas
Operas
French-language operas
Operas by Niccolò Piccinni
Tragédies en musique
Operas based on classical mythology
Operas based on Iphigenia in Tauris